Jurdani is a village in Croatia. 

Populated places in Primorje-Gorski Kotar County